Marc Sohet (born 15 June 1947) is a Belgian racing cyclist. He rode in the 1972 Tour de France.

References

1947 births
Living people
Belgian male cyclists
Place of birth missing (living people)